Jean Kaltenbach (5 April 1927 – 16 April 2021) was a French politician.

Biography
Kaltenbach began his career as a pharmacist in Eurville. He then became Mayor of Eurville in 1965, serving until the commune merged with Bienville in 1972. He then served as the first Mayor of Eurville-Bienville from 1972 to 2001.

Following Bernard Stasi's resignation as President of the Regional Council of Champagne-Ardenne in 1988, Kaltenbach succeeded him. He was re-elected in 1992 with support from the Rally for the Republic (RPR) and the Union for French Democracy (UDF). He opted not to run for re-election in 1998 due to disagreements within the RPR-UDF coalition.

Jean Kaltenbach died on 16 April 2021 at the age of 94.

References

French politicians
1927 births
2021 deaths
Rally for the Republic politicians
People from Doubs
Mayors of places in Grand Est
Regional councillors of France